Sala is a village in Sala Parish, Jēkabpils Municipality in the Selonia region of Latvia.

Towns and villages in Latvia
Jēkabpils Municipality
Friedrichstadt County
Selonia